The High School of Saint Thomas More (STM) is the only private, Roman Catholic comprehensive, co-educational high school in Champaign, Illinois.  It is located in the far northwest part of Champaign. The school has an enrollment of 213 for the 2021–22 academic term. STM reports that 99% of all of their graduates have attended a post-secondary college or university. There are 1243 alumni as of August 2021. The school is headed by Principal Sr. M. Bridget Martin, FSGM and Chief Operating Officer (COO) Anthony Corapi.

History
The High School of Saint Thomas More is the seventh and newest high school of the Catholic Diocese of Peoria. It was dedicated in the summer of 2000 by Francis Cardinal George, OMI, Archbishop of Chicago, and Bishop John J. Myers of Peoria. In 2003, the first class graduated from STM.

Student Body
STM reports that approximately 38% of their population receives institutional financial assistance to help cover their cost of attendance. Furthermore, despite the school's religious affiliation, STM admits students regardless of their own religion. For the 18–19 school year, 20% of students identified as non-Catholic and 22% identified as an ethnic minority.

Sports
STM's nickname is the Sabers and their school colors are Green and Gold. STM offers the following sports: Baseball, Soccer, Football, Tennis, Softball, Track, Basketball, Swimming, Diving, Wrestling, Volleyball, Golf, Cheerleading, and Cross Country.

Since opening in 2000, STM has won six IHSA state championships:

 Girls Basketball, 2014
Boys Cross Country, 2012 
Girls Golf, 2010
Boys Golf, 2008
Girls Volleyball, 2017
Girls Volleyball, 2022

References

External links
 School website

Buildings and structures in Champaign, Illinois
Catholic secondary schools in Illinois
Roman Catholic Diocese of Peoria
Educational institutions established in 2000
Schools in Champaign County, Illinois
2000 establishments in Illinois